Algeria competed at the 2013 Mediterranean Games in Mersin, Turkey from the 20th to 30 June 2013.

Medal summary

Medal table

|  style="text-align:left; width:78%; vertical-align:top;"|

|  style="text-align:left; width:22%; vertical-align:top;"|

Archery 

Men

Women

Athletics 

Men
Track & road events

Women
Track & road events

Field events

Combined events – Heptathlon

Key
Note–Ranks given for track events are within the athlete's heat only
Q = Qualified for the next round
q = Qualified for the next round as a fastest loser or, in field events, by position without achieving the qualifying target
NR = National record
N/A = Round not applicable for the event
Bye = Athlete not required to compete in round

Basketball

Men's tournament

Team roster 

|}
| style="vertical-align:top;" |
 Head coach
Bilal Faid

Legend
Club – describes lastclub before the tournament
Age – describes ageon August 6, 2016
|}

Standings

Results

Boxing 

Men

Cycling

Handball

Men's tournament

Group play

9th/10th classification

Women's tournament

Group play

9th/10th classification

Judo

Rowing

Qualification Legend: FA=Final A (medal); FB=Final B (non-medal); SA/B=Semifinals A/B; SC/D=Semifinals C/D; R=Repechage

Sailing 

Men

Women

Swimming 

Men

Women

Volleyball

Men's tournament

Standings

Results

Fifth place match

References

http://info.mersin2013.gov.tr/medals_country.aspx?n=ALG

Nations at the 2013 Mediterranean Games
2013
Mediterranean Games